HMS Renown (S26) was the third of the Royal Navy's  ballistic missile submarines.

Built by Cammell Laird and launched on 25 February 1967, she was decommissioned in 1996.

Construction
Renown, like the other Resolution-class submarines, was ordered on 8 May 1963 and was laid down at Cammell Laird's Birkenhead shipyard on 25 June 1964. Construction was slower than planned, with poor performance by Cammell Laird and its workforce resulting in both Renown and sister ship  being delayed. Renown was launched on 25 February 1967 by Edna Healey, wife of Denis Healey, the Secretary of State for Defence. By October 1967, Revenge was six months behind programme, and the Ministry of Defence considered towing the unfinished Renown and Revenge to Barrow-in-Furness for completion by Vickers-Armstrongs. She was formally commissioned on 15 November 1968.

Design

Service
Renown struck the entrance to a dock when leaving Lairds for sea trials in February 1969, and collided with a merchant ship, MV Moyle in the Irish Sea on 13 October 1969, which resulted in Renowns commanding officer being found guilty of hazarding his submarine at the resulting court-martial and relieved of command.  Renown finally became operational in November 1969.

In 1974 Renown suffered structural damage when she struck the bottom of the sea during sea trials off Scotland.

Following a refit Renown carried out test firings of Chevaline, which was a modification of the Polaris missiles to enable them to penetrate Soviet anti-ballistic missile defences, in early 1982, and was fully operational with Chevaline late that year.

In the 1990s the ageing Resolution-class was becoming difficult for the Royal Navy to operate, suffering from an increased number of defects, and Renown was forced to remain alongside at Faslane due to defects in 1995 before being decommissioned on 24 February 1996.

References

Bibliography

External links  
 HMS Renown on battleships-cruisers.co.uk

 

Resolution-class submarines
Ships built on the River Mersey
1967 ships
Cold War submarines of the United Kingdom